In the fourth season of the Balkan International Basketball League, twelve participants from the Republic of Macedonia, Bulgaria, Romania, Serbia, Montenegro, Bosnia and Herzegovina and the new represented country Israel has competed.

Teams

Format

Regular season
In the regular season the teams will be divided into two groups, each containing six teams. Each team plays every other team in its group at home and away. The two teams that finished at the top of their group advance to the final four. The teams that finish second and third in their group advance to the quarterfinals.

The opening game has been played on October 11, 2011 and the last match day will be played on March 7, 2012.

Quarterfinals
The teams that finished second in their home played against the third placed teams in the other group in a Best-Of-3 series with home advantage. The first legs are on March 21 and 22, second legs will be played on March 28 and 29. If there is need for third leg the date is set for April 5, 2012.

Final four
The four remaining teams play a semifinal match and the winners of those advance to the final. The losers play in a third-place playoff. This year's dates are April 20 and 22, 2012.

Regular season

Group A

Group B

Quarterfinals
First legs are on March 20 and 28; Second legs are on March 27 and April 3; Third leg, if needed, is on March 29 and April 6

Final four

External links
 BIBL official webpage
 Balkan League standings and livescores

2011-12
2011–12 in European basketball leagues
2011–12 in Serbian basketball
2011–12 in Republic of Macedonia basketball
2011–12 in Romanian basketball
2011–12 in Bulgarian basketball
2011–12 in Montenegrin basketball
2011–12 in Bosnia and Herzegovina basketball
2011–12 in Israeli basketball